Kenneth Lawrence Britt (born September 19, 1988) is a former American football wide receiver. He played college football at Rutgers and was drafted by the Tennessee Titans with the 30th overall pick in the 2009 NFL Draft. He has also played for the St. Louis / Los Angeles Rams, Cleveland Browns and New England Patriots.

College career

Ranked a four-star prospect by Rivals.com, Britt spurned numerous suitors to stay home at his home-state university, Rutgers University. Prior to National Signing Day, there were strong rumors that he would commit to Illinois but he chose to attend Rutgers instead.

Britt was pressed into the starting lineup as a true freshman in 2006. That season, he had a major role in one of the biggest wins in school history, which was the victory over Louisville.

Britt continued his stellar play in the 2007 season, making 62 receptions for 1232 yards and 8 touchdowns, averaging 19.9 yards per catch. Britt led all sophomores in Division I-A football in receiving yards and yards per reception, finishing 11th and 5th in those categories respectively for all of I-A. Britt also led the Big East conference in both categories in 2007, and was rewarded with a spot on the Big East's All-Conference team, and was named by Rutgers as its 2007 offensive MVP.

Coming into the 2008 season, Britt was named to the preseason All-Big East teams by numerous publications, including Phil Steele and Athlon Sports. NationalChamps.net named Britt an honorable mention All-American.

Britt was named to the 2008 Associated Press Third-team All-America. Britt was also a selection for First-team All-Big East in 2008.

On January 3, 2009, Britt announced he would forgo his senior season at Rutgers University and declare himself eligible for the 2009 NFL Draft.

Statistics

Professional career
Britt had a solid NFL Combine performance, running a 4.56 40-yard dash, lifting 23 reps of 225 lbs on bench press, displaying a 37-inch vertical leap, 124.0 inch broad jump, and the 20-yard shuttle in 4.47 seconds. Britt improved his time on his 03/23/09 pro day by running a 4.47 40-yard dash.

Tennessee Titans

Britt was drafted in the 1st round (30th overall) of the 2009 NFL Draft. He was Rutgers' first ever first-round pick. His first game against the Pittsburgh Steelers was solid as he caught four passes for 85 yards, including a 57-yard reception in a 13–10 loss. He scored his first touchdown on the receiving end of a Vince Young pass on November 23, 2009, against the Houston Texans.

On November 29, 2009, Britt caught a ten-yard game-winning touchdown pass in the back of the endzone from Young as time was expiring during a 20-17 victory over the Arizona Cardinals.

During the Titans' Sunday, September 25, 2011, game against the Denver Broncos, Britt tore his medial collateral ligament (MCL) and anterior cruciate ligament (ACL) while dodging a hit from free safety Rahim Moore. On September 28, the team placed Britt on its Injured reserve list.

Entering the 2012 season, Britt had 101 catches for 1,765 yards (17.48 YPC) and fifteen touchdowns.
On October 24, 2010, Kenny caught 7 passes, three touchdowns and gained 225 yards in a 37–19 victory over the Philadelphia Eagles. These were the highest numbers put up by a Titans receiver since Drew Bennett caught 233 yards and three touchdowns against Kansas City on December 13, 2004, and the most yards ever against the Eagles.

Britt was suspended for the first game of the 2012 season due to numerous incidents involving police.

St. Louis / Los Angeles Rams
On March 31, 2014, Britt signed a one-year deal with the St. Louis Rams. The contract was worth $1.4 million with $550,000 guaranteed on the condition that he made the Rams 53-man roster.

Britt re-signed with the Rams on a two-year, $9.125 million contract on March 13, 2015.

In the 2016 season, Britt became the first Rams wide receiver to reach 1,000 yards since Torry Holt in 2007.

Cleveland Browns
On March 9, 2017, Britt signed a four-year, $32.5 million contract with the Cleveland Browns. Britt's effort and commitment to play football came into question throughout the entire season. After recording just 18 catches in nine games, he was released by the Browns on December 8, 2017. It was also reported that Britt requested his release.

New England Patriots
On December 13, 2017, Britt signed a two-year contract with the New England Patriots. The team then went on to Super Bowl LII where they would lose to the Philadelphia Eagles 41-33. Britt was inactive for the Super Bowl. On March 6, 2018, the Patriots decided to pick up Britt's second-year option, retaining him for the 2018 season. Britt was released by the Patriots on August 22, 2018.

NFL career statistics

Personal life
He is married to Sabrina Britt and they have a son and two daughters.

On April 12, 2011, Britt was arrested in New Jersey on three counts (including a felony) following an alleged car chase with police. The charges were later reduced. On June 7, Britt pleaded guilty to careless driving and was fined. On June 8, 2012, Britt was arrested in Hoboken, New Jersey, charged with resisting arrest.

Britt lives in Warren Township, NJ with his family.

References

External links

Los Angeles Rams bio
Tennessee Titans bio
Rutgers Scarlet Knights bio

1988 births
Living people
American football wide receivers
Bayonne High School alumni
Cleveland Browns players
Los Angeles Rams players
New England Patriots players
Players of American football from New Jersey
Rutgers Scarlet Knights football players
Sportspeople from Bayonne, New Jersey
St. Louis Rams players
Tennessee Titans players
Ed Block Courage Award recipients